Charlotte Township may refer to the following townships in the United States:

 Charlotte Township, Livingston County, Illinois
 Charlotte Township, Bates County, Missouri